The Llewellyn Glacier is a glacier located in British Columbia and Alaska. It is the second-largest glacier in the Juneau Icefield. The glacier has rapidly retreated as of recent, and on June 6, 2018, a large kilometre-sized chunk of the narrow tongue of the glacier broke off and plunged into Atlin Lake.

References

Glaciers of British Columbia
Cassiar Land District
Glaciers of Alaska